{{DISPLAYTITLE:C15H19NO3}}
The molecular formula C15H19NO3 may refer to:

 Hydroxytropacocaine
 3',4'-Methylenedioxy-α-pyrrolidinobutiophenone

Molecular formulas